Deh Shams may refer to:
 Deh Shams-e Bozorg
 Deh Shams-e Kuchak